The Automat is a 2021 American documentary directed and produced by Lisa Hurwitz and written by Michael Levine. It is about the automats once operated by Horn & Hardart. It features an original song by Mel Brooks. The film premiered at the Telluride Film Festival on September 2, 2021. It was released in the United States on February 18, 2022, by A Slice of Pie Productions. The film received generally positive reviews from critics.

Synopsis
Horn & Hardart, founded in 1888 by Joseph Horn and Frank Hardart, was noted for operating the first food service automats in Philadelphia and New York City. The restaurant chain was well known in the U.S. for serving food out of a vending machine for a nickel. The last New York Horn & Hardart Automat closed in April 1991.

Appearances
 Mel Brooks
 Ruth Bader Ginsburg
 Elliott Gould
 Colin Powell
 Carl Reiner
 Howard Schultz

Production
The documentary details the rise and fall of the Horn & Hardart automats. Director Lisa Hurwitz was inspired to create the documentary because she loved eating in her school cafeteria day after day during her college days. The film features an original song titled "At the Automat" written and performed by Mel Brooks.

Release
The film premiered at the Telluride Film Festival on September 2, 2021. It was released in the United States on February 18, 2022, by A Slice of Pie Productions.

Reception

Box office
In the United States, the film earned $13,917 from the Film Forum theater in its opening weekend and $15,013 from three theaters in its second weekend. It made $5,852 (a drop of 61%) from two theaters in its third. The film then began to see an incline in earnings with $7,853 from five theaters in its fourth, $9,119 from nine theaters in its fifth, $12,612 from eight theaters in its sixth, and $16,169 from twenty theaters in its seventh. It added $13,535 (a drop of 16%) in its eighth weekend, $9,549 (a drop of 29%) in its ninth, and $5,571 (a drop of 42%) in its tenth. The following weekend, the film earned $10,959 from twelve theaters, an increase of 97%. It added $4,787 (a decline of 56%) in its twelfth weekend, before an increase of 95% in its thirteenth weekend with $9,314. It then saw a decrease of 78.3% in its fourteenth weekend after earning $2,025, before bouncing back 72.6% the following weekend to $3,496. It went on to earn $2,407, $1,330, $1,037, and $873, respectively throughout the next four weekends. It left theaters in late June but returned by July 8, 2022, grossing $420 from one theater in its twenty-first weekend, before departing again and returning with another $2,055 in its twenty-third.

Reception

 

The Hollywood Reporters Stephen Farber wrote, "Hurwitz supplements the talking heads with tasty archival footage and sharp graphics. Her film is sleek and unpretentious. It wins us over with humor and a pointed touch of melancholy." Varietys Owen Gleiberman said the film "taps into so many resonant aspects of what America used to be that to watch it is to be drawn into an enchanting and wistfully profound time-tripping reverie." Writing for The New York Observer, Rex Reed said it "gets to the core of the Automat's significance, cutting to the core of its social impact on New York and the changing world we live in." The New Yorkers Richard Brody said the best part of the film was "its blend of social and intellectual history with its anecdotal history—its evocation of the links between intention, practice, and experience; its depiction of a largely lost aesthetic of daily life."

References

External links
 
 
 

2021 directorial debut films
2021 documentary films
2021 films
American documentary films
Films about food and drink
Films scored by Hummie Mann
Films set in New York City
Films set in Philadelphia
2020s English-language films
2020s American films